Waddingham is an English surname derived from the French Boudignon, and the name was brought to England after the Norman Conquest. Notable people with the surname include:

Cindy Waddingham (born 1980), Australian actress
Dorothea Waddingham (1899–1936), English murderer
Gladys Waddingham (1900–1997), American writer
Hannah Waddingham (born 1974), English actress and singer

English-language surnames